Athletics at the 2001 Games of the Small States of Europe were held in San Marino on 30 May, 1 and 2 June.

Medal summary

Men

Women

Men's results

100 metres

Heats – 30 MayWind:Heat 1: +1.2 m/s, Heat 2: +1.9 m/s

Final – May 30Wind:+1.6 m/s

200 metres
June 2Wind: +2.9 m/s

400 metres
June 1

800 metres
June 1

1500 metres
June 2

5000 metres
June 1

10,000 metres
May 30

110 metres hurdles
June 1Wind: +0.8 m/s

400 metres hurdles
June 1

3000 metres steeplechase
May 30

4 x 100 metres relay
June 2

4 x 400 metres relay
June 2

High jump
June 2

Long jump
June 1

Triple jump
May 30

Shot put
May 30

Discus throw
May 30

Javelin throw
June 1

Women's results

100 metres

Heats – 30 MayWind:Heat 1: +1.2 m/s, Heat 2: +1.2 m/s

Final – May 30Wind:+1.8 m/s

200 metres
June 2Wind: +2.5 m/s

400 metres
June 1

800 metres
June 1

1500 metres
June 2

5000 metres
May 30

10,000 metres
June 1

4 x 100 metres relay
June 2

4 x 400 metres relay
June 2

High jump
May 30

Long jump
June 2

Triple jump
June 1

Javelin throw
June 2

Medal table

References

Results (archived)

Games of the Small States of Europe
2001 Games of the Small States of Europe
2001
2001 Games of the Small States of Europe